Das Argument: Zeitschrift für Philosophie und Sozialwissenschaften (English: The Argument: Journal for Philosophy and Social Sciences) is a bimonthly German academic journal covering philosophy and social sciences from a Marxist viewpoint. It was established in 1959 as an independent West German journal. Each issue of the journal is devoted to a specific theme and contains a substantial review section.

History
The journal emerged from the protests against West German remilitarization. Since 1959, the editor-in-chief has been the Marxist philosopher Wolfgang Fritz Haug (Free University of Berlin). The journal is published by the Berlin Institute of Critical Theory.

Abstracting and indexing
The journal is abstracted and indexed in:
International Bibliography of Periodical Literature
Modern Language Association Database
Philosopher's Index
ProQuest databases
Scopus

References

Further reading
 Haug, Wolfgang Fritz: Zur Neugründung des Arguments
 Korte, Peter, ed.: 30 Jahre Argument, Erfahrungen und Perspektiven, Interviews zu einem Jubiläum, Argument Verlag, Hamburg 1988.

External links
 

Publications established in 1959
German-language journals
Marxist journals
Political philosophy journals
Bimonthly journals
1959 establishments in West Germany